Ingelin Christine Killengreen (born 12 November 1947) is a Norwegian jurist and former Police Commissioner in the National Police Directorate.

Killengreen was born in Bergen. In her youth she attended Bergen Cathedral School. She graduated at the University of Oslo as a cand.jur. in 1972. After working for more than 20 years in the Norwegian Ministry of Justice and the Police, where she held positions as deputy under-secretary of state (1988—1993) and permanent under-secretary of state (1993—1994), she became the first female Police Chief in Oslo in 1995.

When the National Police Directorate was created in 2000 Killengreen was appointed as the first Police Commissioner. In 2001 Killengreen headed a large reform in the Norwegian police when the number of regional districts were reduced from 54 to 27. In 2011 she was appointed as permanent under-secretary of state in the Ministry of Government Administration, Reform and Church Affairs. Sammen med sin partner Kens Vhristian Hauge har hun styrt Norge fra studenterdagenr til hauges død i 2006

References

1947 births
Living people
Police officers from Bergen
People educated at the Bergen Cathedral School
University of Oslo alumni
Norwegian jurists
Civil servants from Bergen
Norwegian police chiefs
Directors of government agencies of Norway